Exposures – In Retrospect and Denial is a compilation album by the Swedish melodic death metal band Dark Tranquillity, that was released in 2004.

Disc 1 Tracks 1 and 2 were recorded during the Damage Done sessions in 2002. Track 1 had been unreleased, and track 2 had been only available on the Japanese version of the album.

Disc 1 Tracks 3-5 were recorded during the Haven sessions in 2000. Tracks 3 and 4 had been unreleased, and track 5 had been only available on the Japanese version of the album.

Disc 1 Tracks 6 and 7 were recorded during the Projector sessions in 1998. Track 6 had been available on the limited digipak edition of the album, and track 7 was on a Limited Edition of this album.

Disc 1 Tracks 8 and 9 were taken from the A Moonclad Reflection EP (1992).

Disc 1 Tracks 10-12 were taken from the Trail of Life Decayed demo (1991).

Some early versions of the release for Disc 1, have the tracks 3 & 4 and 6 & 7 flipped or misprinted.

Track listing

Disc 1

Disc 2

Credits
Dark Tranquillity
Mikael Stanne - vocals (disc 1, 1-7), (disc 2, 1-18), backing vocals, guitar (disc 1, 8-12)
Martin Henriksson - guitar (disc 1, 1-5), (disc 2), bass (disc 1, 6-12)
Michael Nicklasson - bass (disc 1, 1-5), (disc 2)
Martin Brändström - keyboards and electronics (disc 1, 1-5), (disc 2)
Niklas Sundin - guitar
Anders Jivarp - drum kit

Additional personnel
Fredrik Johansson − guitar (disc 1, 5 & 6)
Anders Fridén - vocals (disc 1, 8-12)

Other personnel
Göran Finnberg - mastering (disc 2)
Cabin Fever Media - art direction and design

References

External links
 Album info at official site
 Century Media Records

Dark Tranquillity albums
2004 compilation albums
Century Media Records compilation albums
2004 live albums
Century Media Records live albums
Albums produced by Fredrik Nordström